The 11th Chennai International Film Festival took place in Chennai , Tamil Nadu, India from 12 to 19 December 2013. The event was organised by the Indo Cine Appreciation Foundation (ICAF) with support from the Government of Tamil Nadu. The festival was curated by actress-director Suhasini Maniratnam and inaugurated by Kamal Haasan and Aamir Khan. The Japanese drama Like Father, Like Son marked the beginning of the fest.

Director Rakeysh Omprakash Mehra presided over the valedictory function and presented the awards. Thanga Meenkal, Haridas and Paradesi won the Tamil film competition and composer Anirudh Ravichander was awarded the newly instituted Amitabh Bachchan award for "Youth Icon of the Year".

History 
The Chennai International Film Festival (CIFF) was instituted in the year 2003 by the Indo Cine Appreciation Foundation (ICAF), a non-profit organisation. ICAF is a registered film society and works for the promotion of meaningful cinema by organising country centric festivals throughout the year by obtaining films from Embassies and Consulates, and has around 500 members, including film directors, cinematographers and technicians. In 2008, the Government of Tamil Nadu began supporting the event by sponsoring a part of it. The fest was reinvented in 2010 following the involvement of actor-director Suhasini which spiraled the direct involvement of film personalities in coordinating the fest. Since then, the government has been supporting the subsequent editions of the festival. The fest is conducted every year during the month of December.

The festival awards the best of Tamil cinema through a Tamil Feature Film Competition where 12 shortlisted films compete every year for the prize money of  6 lakh. Apart from awards for the Best Feature Film and the Second Best Feature Film, there is a Special Jury Award and a Film Buff Award, which is a web-based award given to the person who watches the maximum number of films and gives his own personalized account of the films watched.

11th CIFF 
The 11th edition of the film festival was also organised by the ICAF. Emanadar Thangaraj, General Secretary of ICAF, invited actor-director Suhasini Maniratnam to curate the event. The fest was conducted between 12 and 19 December 2013 and a total of 165 films were screened in 8 screens across 5 venues. Presented by the national newspaper The Hindu and the Tamil satellite channel Pudhuyugam, the event saw the participation of 58 countries. The film festival celebrated the spirit of international cinema and the Centenary of Indian Cinema. Though the festival was supported by the state government, the funds were raised mainly through sponsorship and donations by celebrity volunteers. A specially designed poster was unveiled on 6 November 2013. An anthem song was set to tunes by Prakash Nikki. The lyrics was written by Rohini and sung by Andrea Jeremiah, Vallavan and Yuki. The song was used for promotional purpose and was released a day before the fest began.

As is the norm, the fest has a Tamil Feature Film Competition. In a press conference held on 6 November 2013, Thangaraj made the official announcement while the registration for the same began in early June 2013 with the last date being extended from 30 September to 15 November. Producers of Tamil films censored between 16 October 2012 and 15 October 2013 were invited to apply for the competition. The 11th edition also saw the institution of a new award, the 'Amitabh Bachchan Youth Icon Award', as a token of respect to Bachchan who graced the closing ceremony of the fest the previous year. Ironically though, the CIFF Documentary Contest that took place the previous year was absent.

Inauguration 
Actress Shabana Azmi, who was expected to be present for the inaugural following an invite by Thangaraj, could not make her presence. The event was set in motion at around 5:30 PM on 12 December 2013 at Sir Mutha Venkata Subba Rao Concert Hall. The fest was inaugurated by Tamil actor-director Kamal Haasan and Bollywood actor-director-TV anchor Aamir Khan in the presence of celebrities including Mohanlal. Khan who resides at Mumbai attended the event in Chennai at his own expense following the example set by Amitabh Bachchan the previous year. A week prior to the inauguration, in a curtain-raiser interview to The Hindu, Khan emphasised the need for social commitment in films. Following the inauguration, in an open stage interaction with Suhasini, Haasan underlined the importance of script writing and was quoted saying "There are books, but books will not make cinema. Even Shakespeare will have to learn script-writing." In response to a question raised by singer S. P. Balasubrahmanyam on the need for qualified critics in censor board, Haasan also called for the film industry to take the responsibility of censoring films as he felt that those on the Censor Board were not qualified enough to do so. As part of his inaugural speech, Khan wished for a chain of theatres to showcase world cinema and Indian art-house films throughout the year claiming "these films do attract considerable audience."

The inauguration was compered by actress Abhirami and Ramya of the CIFF. The event began with poetry reading of select Tamil film songs by actresses Rohini and Poornima Bhagyaraj followed by a music session with performances by vocalist Karthik and pianist Anil Srinivasan, who rendered songs of Ilaiyaraja. As part of the event, dancers Shobana, Swarnamalya and their students presented thematic dance performances.

Main Event 
The main event of the fest constitutes the screening of 165 films that includes 12 Tamil films as part of the Tamil Feature Film Competition, 17 films of Indian Panorama, and three documentaries, one each on Ellis R. Dungan, Gemini Ganesan and K. Subramanyam. The film festival featured retrospectives of Goran Paskaljevic from Serbia (seven films), Claire Denis from France (five films) and Istvan Szabo from Hungary (three films). The event also included a special section showcasing six films from contemporary Turkey apart from a country focus on Taiwan and Iran. The fest had a special focus on award-winning films from international film festivals like Cannes, Berlin and Venice some of which were screened. The venues for the screening were the Woodlands Multiplex (2 screens), Inox (2 screens), Abhirami Mega Mall (2 screens), Casino Theatre and Rani Seethai Hall.

Three documentary films were screened in a Special Section. An American in Madras is a documentary on American-Tamil film director Ellis R. Dungan. The documentary was the a result of a research by Karan Bali of Upperstall.com, a film website that focuses on classic and independent Indian cinema and its luminaries. The Tamil romantic-drama Kadhal Mannan is a documentary on veteran actor Gemini Ganesan, who was popularly known by the moniker 'Kadhal Mannan'. The third was a documentary on director K. Subramanyam titled He Swam Against the Colonial Current. The docu was made for the Public Service Broadcasting Trust (PSBT), New Delhi, by S. Krishnaswamy, Subrahmanyam's son.

The fest got rolling with the screening of the Hirokazu Koreeda directed Like Father, Like Son, the English remake rights of which have been bought by Steven Spielberg. The red carpet screenings include The Hunt, Walesa: Man of Hope, The Past, Omar, The Great Beauty and Harmony Lessons. Claudia Lacotte of Eye on Films, a France-based distribution company, addressed the film industry and aspiring filmmakers on the importance of circulating feature films across film festivals around the globe.

Forum Discussions 
The event conducted three Forum Discussions, two in English and one in Tamil. The first of the three held at Inox, 'How to crowd fund your movie?' was moderated by filmmaker Alphonse Roy. Director Pawan Kumar who had directed the Kannada hit Lucia completely through crowd-funding and documentary filmmaker Amudhan R.P., discussed the possibility and ways of crowd-funding a film project. Rohini and independent filmmaker-journalist-film critic Sudhish Kamath also participated in the lively discussion. In another discussion on 'Women behind Cinema' moderated by Suhasini, the panel, including female producers and entrepreneurs Pushpa Kandasamy of Kavithalayaa Productions, Archana Kalpathi of AGS Cinemas, Sitara Suresh and Nivedha Priyadarshini discussed the difficulties faced by women filmmakers and technicians. The third forum also held at Inox titled 'Realising Novel Ideas Successfully' discussed bringing novel ideas to films. The team behind Naduvula Konjam Pakkatha Kaanom along with writer-filmmaker Amshan Kumar, Gautami and Sudhish Kamath took part where the question of 'why do we make films?' cropped up. Suhasini quoted Walt Disney saying "We don't make movies to make money. We make money to make more movies."

Excluding the aforementioned, 'Cinema of Cruelty', a discussion on Tamil cinema, pondered over the excessive violence found in Tamil films and its influences, citing that Paruthiveeran and Subramaniapuram started the trend inspiring even acclaimed filmmaker Anurag Kashyap to make a film like Gangs of Wasseypur.

Reception 
The Great Beauty
Parviz
Walesa: A Man of Hope
The Hunt
Blue Is The Warmest Colour
Omar
Midhunam
Like Father, Like Son

Jury 
The jury members for the Tamil feature film competition was introduced by Rohini. The jury was headed by producer-director R. V. Udayakumar and constitutes actor-director Sripriya and prominent writer S. Ramakrishnan. Twelve films were short listed from a total of 17 entries.

Closing ceremony 
The 8-day film festival came to a close on 19 December 2013. The closing ceremony was held at Sir Mutha Venkata Subba Rao Concert Hall. While Mohanlal was reported to be one of the chief guests of the evening, he skipped it having made it to the inauguration. Director Rakeysh Omprakash Mehra was the sole chief guest. The closing was anchored by Karthi and Anu Hasan. Following a live concert by composer Anirudh Ravichander, the chief guest handed over the various awards. Thanga Meenkal and Haridas won the first and second place in the Tamil Competition while its child actors won the newly instituted award for Best Child Artistes. The Special Jury Award for Individual Excellence was presented to Adharvaa for his performance in Paradesi. Anirudh won the maiden Amitabh Bachchan award for Youth Icon of the year. The winner of the Online Film Buff Award was announced as Pavithran Sivam through their Facebook page.

Promotion 
The organisers decided to get the city involved in the event. Suhasini says, "That’s when we decided to stage a flash mob. This year, we also have Zumba. We have festival tees, student volunteers, more cinema halls, and several stars." In a move to publicise the fest among the public, the organisers held flash mob dances and Zumba by the beach. On 11 December 2013, a day before the event began, dancers from the professional dance group 'The S Community of Entertainment', created a flash mob at the atrium of Express Avenue. They were joined by Vijay Sethupathi, Jayam Ravi, Suhasini, etc. for the five-minute performance. During the after-party following the inauguration, professional dancers who were rehearsing Zumba was joined by the Khan, Mohanlal, Suhasini and a few more who would perform later. On the morning of 15 December, a set was erected at the Schmidt Memorial, Besant Nagar Beach and Zumba was performed by celebrities including Suhasini, Anita Ratnam, Shanthanu Bhagyaraj, VJ Ramya Subramaniam, Ashok Kumar, Maanu and Abhirami.

Screenings

Retrospectives 
 Retrospective of Goran Paskaljevic

 Retrospective of István Szabó

 Retrospective of Claire Denis

World Cinema

Country Focus: Taiwan

Country Focus: Iran

Contemporary Films: Turkey

Eye on Films

Indian Panorama

Tamil Competition

Special Screening

Awards 
 Best Feature Film: Thanga Meenkal ( 1 lakh each for producer and director)
 Second Best Feature Film: Haridas ( 1 lakh each for producer and director)
 Special Jury Award: Adharvaa for Paradesi
 Amitabh Bachchan Youth Icon of the Year: Anirudh Ravichander
 Best Child Artistes: Sadhana for Thanga Meenkal and Prithiviraj Das for Haridas
 Online Film Buff Award: Pavithran Sivam

Sponsors 
The event, jointly presented by The Hindu and Pudhuyugam, was sponsored by the South India Shelters Pvt Ltd (SIS) with Foams India being the associate sponsor. Other sponsors were Qube Cinema Network, Real Image Technologies (award sponsor), PVP Cinema, TVS, Madras Talkies, Indian Overseas Bank, The Savera, Gamesa, Hot Breads, Tripadam Logistics, Casino Theatre, Woodlands Multiplex, Inox, Abirami Mega Mall, Nithra, IndiaGlitz, Rani Seethai Hall, Fingrid, Deco aro, Ticket New, Reliance Entertainment, Institut Francais, Goethe Institut.

References

External links 

 
 11th Chennai International Film Festival at the Internet Movie Database
 Chennai International Film Festival at The Hindu (in Tamil)

2013 film festivals
2013 festivals in Asia
2013 in Indian cinema
Film festivals in India
Culture of Chennai
December 2013 events in India
Events in Chennai